Queen Mab is a fairy in Shakespeare's Romeo and Juliet, and later in other poetry, literature, drama and cinema. 

Queen Mab may also refer to:

 Queen Mab (horse), imported to the New World in 1747
 Queen Mab (poem), by Percy Bysshe Shelley, 1813
 "Queen Mab", a song by Donovan on the 1971 album HMS Donovan
 "Queen Mab", a song by Murder by Death from the 2012 album Bitter Drink, Bitter Moon
 Queen Mab Scherzo, part of Roméo et Juliette by Berlioz

See also